Veľké Kozmálovce  is a village and municipality in the Levice District in the Nitra Region of Slovakia.

History
Veľké Kozmálovce was first mentioned in writing in 1322 as Kozmal. In 1362 the village was owned by the Forgách family, later it was in Lewenz and Goldmorawitz and was last owned by the Migazzi family. The municipal area also includes two lost medieval settlements, Braian and Scevlen. In 1618 the place was plundered by the Turks. In 1534 there were four porta, in 1601 there were 45 houses in the village, according to a Turkish tax register from 1664 there were 43 taxpayers and 33 households here. In 1720 there were 23 taxpayers, in 1828 there were 69 houses and 445 inhabitants employed as farmers.

Until 1918, the village in Bars county belonged to the Kingdom of Hungary and then came to Czechoslovakia and today Slovakia.

From 1986 to 1995 Veľké Kozmálovce was part of the town of Tlmače.

Geography
The village lies at an altitude of 170 metres and covers an area of 5.924 km2. It has a population of about 705 people.

Demographics
According to the 2011 census, Veľké Kozmálovce had a population of 705, of which 702 were Slovaks and one Hungarian and one Czech. One resident did not specify the ethnicity.

651 residents are affiliated with the Roman Catholic Church, 15 residents with the Evangelical Church , one with the Orthodox Church and three with another denomination. 25 residents were non-denominational and with 10 residents the denomination was not determined.

Facilities
The village has a public library and football pitch. Along with the Roman Catholic, All Saints Church from the 18th century.

References

External links
https://web.archive.org/web/20070513023228/http://www.statistics.sk/mosmis/eng/run.html

Villages and municipalities in Levice District